Lulua River is a river in the Congo basin in Africa situated in the Democratic Republic of Congo. It is a right tributary of the Kasai River. 

Rivers of the Democratic Republic of the Congo